The Selkirk locomotives were 36 steam locomotives of the 2-10-4 wheel arrangement built for Canadian Pacific Railway by Montreal Locomotive Works, Montreal in Quebec, Canada.

History
The first of these large engines, which had a 2-10-4 wheel arrangement, was built in July 1929. Altogether, twenty were constructed before the end of this year bearing numbers 5900 to 5919. The Canadian Pacific Railway's classification was T1a. These locomotives weighed  fully loaded. They were the largest and most powerful locomotives in the British Empire. While most other 2-10-4s were named after the state of Texas, these locomotives were named after the Selkirk range of mountains that they crossed, the (railway) summit of which was located just inside the western portal of the Connaught Tunnel beneath Rogers Pass.

Montreal Locomotive Works built another ten of these successful Selkirk locomotives during November and December 1938. The Canadian Pacific Railway assigned them T1b class. They were numbered from 5920 to 5929. A further six Selkirks, classed T1c, were built by the Montreal Locomotive Works shop in 1949. They were the last standard gauge steam locomotives built in Canada for a Canadian railway. They were much the same as the T1b except for a few refinements, including two cross-compound air compressors to speed recharging of the air brake system. Some small streamlining touches were not retained. The streamlined casing around the smokebox stack was now absent as was the teardrop shape of the classification lights. Also, the inside of the cabs were no longer lined/insulated in the same manner as the previous classes. (Previous classes had provided better cold-weather cab insulation and were better-liked by engine crews.) They were all equipped with boosters (some shortly after being built) and all Selkirks (5900 through 5935) were built as oil burners.

All of the later T1b and T1c-class locomotives were semi-streamlined and were painted with CPR Tuscan red panels along the sides of their running boards, beneath the cab windows and on the sides of the tenders with gold leaf (originally) border trim (which was later changed to a type of yellow similar to "duluxe gold"). Some of the original T1a-class Selkirks also received this paint scheme (but with narrower panels along the sides of the running boards that widened in the middle to carry the locomotive's road number).

The Laggan Subdivision covered the eastern portion of their assigned territory  and included the Field Hill and the Spiral Tunnels while the western portion of their primary, assigned territory consisted of the Mountain Subdivision which covered the remaining  and included Rogers Pass, the Connaught Tunnel and Stoney Creek Bridge. The grades encountered had a maximum of 2.2% (1 in 45), with curves of 12° or  radius. Rated at  tractive effort, on the lesser grades they could haul  unassisted and without the booster cut-in. Due to their extreme weight, they could not proceed west of Taft to Vancouver.

When diesels began operation between Calgary and Revelstoke in the early 1950s, the Selkirks were reassigned to work the Brooks and Maple Creek subdivisions between Calgary and Swift Current, Saskatchewan. They were also used to haul freight trains north of their new Alyth terminal (located in Calgary) as far as Edmonton.  At least some of the reassigned Selkirks received an "all black" (non-passenger) paint scheme without CPR Tuscan red panels and without grey or "blued" metal boiler-jackets; however, they still retained the yellow panel trim around the previous CPR Tuscan red (now black) panels (on those locomotives formerly painted with "outlined" panels).

The last Selkirks (5930 through 5935) were taken out of service in 1959. All but two of this (T1c) class were scrapped. None of the earlier T1a class or T1b class locomotives was preserved. The first (T1a class) Selkirks had a heavier-looking, non-streamlined appearance which were better examples of the heavy steam-power look and their original, as-delivered rear sand-domes were removed early in their service-life. The 5935 is preserved in the Canadian Railway Museum, in Saint-Constant, Quebec. The 5931 (which was repainted and intentionally renumbered incorrectly as 5934 upon initial public display near downtown Calgary) was eventually repainted and renumbered again, this time with its correct/original number, 5931.  This coincided with its move and relocation to the main entrance to Heritage Park in Calgary, Alberta.

References
 
 

Canadian Pacific Railway locomotives
Steam locomotives of Canada
2-10-4 locomotives
MLW locomotives
Streamlined steam locomotives
Railway locomotives introduced in 1929
Standard gauge locomotives of Canada